Vanchiyankulam is a village in Sri Lanka. It is located within the Mannar District of the Northern Province and as of 2012 it had a population of 511.

See also
List of towns in Northern Province, Sri Lanka

External links

Populated places in Northern Province, Sri Lanka
Villages in Mannar District